The Night I Fell in Love is the fourth studio album by American R&B/soul singer-songwriter Luther Vandross, released on March 8, 1985 by Epic Records. In 1986, Vandross garnered a nomination for the Grammy Award for Best Male R&B Vocal Performance and two American Music Awards, Favorite Soul/R&B Male Artist and Favorite Soul/R&B Album. The first single "'Til My Baby Comes Home" is notable for featuring Billy Preston on organ.

The Night I Fell in Love reached number nineteen on the US Billboard 200 album chart and topped the Top R&B/Hip-Hop Albums charts, it was ranked #93 on Rolling Stone Magazine's list of the 100 best albums of the 1980s. The album was later be certified double platinum by the Recording Industry Association of America (RIAA).

Track listing

Personnel 
 Luther Vandross – lead and backing vocals, vocal arrangements 
 Nat Adderley, Jr. – keyboards, synthesizers, string arrangements, rhythm and synthesizer arrangements (3, 4, 6, 7, 8)
 John "Skip" Anderson – synthesizers, synthesizer programming 
 Marcus Miller – synthesizers, backing vocals, rhythm and synthesizer arrangements (1, 2, 5), bass (2-8)
 Ed Walsh – synthesizers, synthesizer programming 
 Billy Preston – organ (1)
 Doc Powell – guitar
 Georg Wadenius – guitar
 Eluriel Barfield – bass (1)
 Yogi Horton – drums
 Paulinho da Costa – percussion, congas
 Steve Kroon – congas, bongos
 Alfa Anderson – backing vocals
 Phillip Ballou – backing vocals
 Michelle Cobbs – backing vocals
 Lisa Fischer – backing vocals
 Cissy Houston – backing vocals
 Yvonne Lewis – backing vocals
 Darlene Love – backing vocals
 Paulette McWilliams – backing vocals
 Brenda White King – backing vocals

Production 
 Marcus Miller – producer (1, 2, 5)
 Luther Vandross – producer
 Larkin Arnold – executive producer
 Ray Bardani – engineer, mixing 
 Greg Calbi – mastering at Sterling Sound (New York, NY).
 Dominick Celani – production assistant 
 Sephra Herman – production coordinator, music contractor 
 George Corsillo – art direction, design 
 Brian Hagiwara – photography 
 Shep Gordon – management 
 Daniel S. Markus – management

Charts

Weekly charts

Year-end charts

Certifications

References

1985 albums
Epic Records albums
Luther Vandross albums
Albums produced by Luther Vandross
Albums produced by Marcus Miller
Albums recorded at AIR Studios